Tchangmargarya is a genus of large operculate freshwater snails, aquatic gastropod mollusks in the family Viviparidae.

Taxonomy

Tchangmargarya originally was a subgenus of Margarya, and is elevated to a full genus based on molecular phylogeny and comparative morphology study.

Distribution

This genus appear to be endemic to Yangzong Lake and lakes in Stone Forest in Yunnan Province in the China.

Species
There are 3 extant species of Tchangmargarya:

  Tchangmargarya yangtsunghaiensis (Tchang & Tsi, 1949) -type species (possibly extinct)
 Tchangmargarya multilabiata Zhang & Chen, 2015 
 Tchangmargarya ziyi Zhang, 2017 (possibly extinct)

References

External links
 

Viviparidae